Lauren Rachel Catherine Rowles,  (born 24 April 1998) is a British parasport rower and former wheelchair athlete. She won gold with Laurence Whiteley in the trunk-arms mixed double sculls (TAMix2x) at the 2016 Summer Paralympics.The pair repeated their achievement in Tokyo at the 2021 Summer Paralympics.

Background 
Rowles, who is from Cofton Hackett, Bromsgrove District, attended North Bromsgrove High School. At the age of 13 she suddenly developed transverse myelitis (a condition in which the spinal cord is inflamed), which left her with no feeling below her chest. She decided to take up Paralympic sport while watching coverage of the 2012 Summer Paralympics during a stay in Stoke Mandeville Spinal Injuries Unit.

Rowles completed her A-levels at King Edward VI College, Stourbridge, and is currently studying law at Oxford Brookes University. She is openly gay. Rowles is in a relationship with Jude Hamer, a wheelchair basketball player.

Career 
Rowles competed as a wheelchair racer before switching to rowing. She took up the sport in November 2012 and competed in T54 events. In 2014, she was the England under-16s champion at 100 m, 200 m and 1,500 m. She represented England at the 2014 Commonwealth Games, where she was the youngest track and field athlete in the England team at the age of 16. She reached the final of the T54 1500m, finishing ninth.

Rowles took up rowing in early 2015. She quickly teamed up with Laurence Whiteley, who had been searching for a suitable partner to compete with for over two years. They competed at the 2015 World Rowing Championships, winning the silver medal in the trunk-arms mixed double sculls. She and Whiteley competed at their first Paralympics in 2016, where they set a world record in the heats, and won gold in the final.

References 

1998 births
Living people
English female rowers
Rowers at the 2016 Summer Paralympics
Medalists at the 2016 Summer Paralympics
Rowers at the 2020 Summer Paralympics
Medalists at the 2020 Summer Paralympics
Paralympic gold medalists for Great Britain
English female wheelchair racers
English people with disabilities
Sportswomen with disabilities
Track and field athletes with disabilities
Commonwealth Games competitors for England
Athletes (track and field) at the 2014 Commonwealth Games
Members of the Order of the British Empire
People from Bromsgrove District
People with paraplegia
Sportspeople from the West Midlands (county)
World Rowing Championships medalists for Great Britain
Sportspeople from Worcestershire
Paralympic medalists in rowing
Paralympic rowers of Great Britain
English LGBT sportspeople
LGBT rowers
Lesbian sportswomen